The 14th Pan American Games were held in Santo Domingo, Dominican Republic from August 1 to August 17, 2003.

Medals

Bronze

Men's Pole Vault: Dominic Johnson

Results by event

Swimming

Men's Competition

See also
Saint Lucia at the 2002 Central American and Caribbean Games
Saint Lucia at the 2004 Summer Olympics

References

Nations at the 2003 Pan American Games
2003
Pan